Hallelujah  is a 1929 American pre-Code Metro-Goldwyn-Mayer musical directed by King Vidor, and starring Daniel L. Haynes and Nina Mae McKinney.

Filmed in Tennessee and Arkansas and chronicling the troubled quest of a sharecropper, Zeke Johnson (Haynes), and his relationship with the seductive Chick (McKinney), Hallelujah was one of the first films with an all-African American cast produced by a major studio. (Although frequently touted as Hollywood's first all-black cast musical, that distinction more properly belongs to Hearts in Dixie, which premiered several months earlier.) It was intended for a general audience and was considered so risky a venture by MGM that they required King Vidor to invest his own salary in the production. Vidor expressed an interest in "showing the Southern Negro as he is" and attempted to present a relatively non-stereotyped view of African-American life.

Hallelujah was King Vidor's first sound film, and combined sound recorded on location and sound recorded post-production in Hollywood. King Vidor was nominated for a Best Director Oscar for the film.

In 2008, Hallelujah was selected for preservation in the United States National Film Registry by the Library of Congress as being "culturally, historically, or aesthetically significant." In February 2020, the film was shown at the 70th Berlin International Film Festival, as part of a retrospective dedicated to King Vidor's career.

The film contains two scenes of "trucking": a contemporary dance craze where the participant makes movements backward and forward, but with no actual change of position, whilst moving the arms like a piston on a locomotive wheel.

Development
Years before creating Hallelujah, King Vidor had longed to make a film employing an all-African American cast. He had floated the idea around for years but "the studio kept turning the idea down". Vidor’s was in Europe during 1928 promoting his film The Crowd, when heard of  talking motion pictures emerging in the United States. He wanted an all-African American cast to sing "negro spirituals" after he had seen the success of it on Broadway. Vidor stated, "If stage plays with all negro casts, and stories like those by Octavus Roy Cohen and others, could have such great success, why shouldn’t the screen make a successful negro play?" Vidor was able to convince Nicholas Schenck, who was the president of MGM at the time, to get the movie made by framing it more as a film that depicted African American’s sexual deviance. Schenck put it simply to Vidor, "Well, if you think like that, I’ll let you make a picture about whores". Vidor received the inspiration to create this film based on real incidents he witnessed as a child during his time at home in the south. He observed: "I used to watch the negroes in the South, which was my home. I studied their music, and I used to wonder at the pent-up romance in them". Vidor began shooting in Arkansas, Memphis and Southern California at the MGM studios.

Plot
The people inhabit a world of racial paternalism where, partly due to religion, the plantation workers are happy with the status  quo. Zeke the plantation boy represents the morally upstanding country boy (the good) against the morally corrupt (due to Hotshot's influence) city girl Chick (the bad) who tempts him from the straight and narrow.

Sharecroppers Zeke and Spunk Johnson sell their family's portion of the cotton crop for $100. They are promptly cheated out of the money by the shill Chick (Nina Mae McKinney), in collusion with her gambling-hustler boyfriend, Hot Shot. Spunk is murdered in the ensuing brawl. Zeke runs away and reforms his life: becoming a Baptist minister, and using his full name - Zekiel. This is the first example of black character development in cinema.

Sometime later, he returns and preaches a rousing revival. After being ridiculed and enticed by Chick, Zekiel becomes engaged to a virtuous maiden named Missy (Victoria Spivey), thinking this will ward off his desires for the sinful Chick. Chick attends a sermon, heckling Zekiel, then asks for baptism but is clearly not truly repentant. During a rousing sermon, Chick seduces Zekiel and he throws away his new life for her. Months later, Zeke has started a new life; he is working at a sawmill and is married to Chick, who is secretly cheating on him with her old flame, Hot Shot (William Fountaine).

Chick and Hot Shot decide to run off together; Zeke finds out about their affair and chases after them. The carriage carrying Hot Shot and Chick loses a wheel and throws Chick out, giving Zeke a chance to catch up to them.  Holding her in his arms, he watches Chick die as she apologizes to him for being unable to change her ways. Zeke then chases Hot Shot on foot. He stalks him relentlessly through the woods and swamp while Hot Shot tries to escape, but stumbles until Zeke finally catches and kills him. Zeke spends time in prison for his crime, breaking rocks.

The movie ends with Zeke returning home to his family, just as they are harvesting their crop. Despite the time that has passed and the way Zekiel left, the family joyfully welcomes him back into the flock.

Cast
Daniel L. Haynes as Zeke
Nina Mae McKinney as Chick
William Fountaine as Hot Shot
Harry Gray as Parson
Fanny Belle DeKnight as Mammy
Everett McGarrity as Spunk 
Victoria Spivey as Missy Rose
Milton Dickerson
Robert Couch
Walter Tait as Johnson Kids
and Dixie Jubilee Singers

The music
The film gives, in some sections, an authentic representation of black entertainment and religious music in the 1920s, though some of the sequences are Europeanized and over-arranged. In the outdoor revival meeting, with the preacher singing and acting out the "train to hell," is authentic in style until the end, where he launches into Irving Berlin's "Waiting at the End of the Road". Similarly, an outdoor group of workers near the beginning of the film are singing a choral arrangement of "Way Down Upon the Swanee River" (written by Stephen Foster, who never visited the South). Supposedly, according to Vidor himself in an interview given to The New York Times, "while Stephen Foster and others were inspired by hearing negro songs on the levees, their music was not at all of the negro type". He went on to add that Foster’s music had "the distinct finish and technique of European music, possibly of German Origin."

A sequence which is of vital importance in the history of classic jazz is in the dancehall, where Nina Mae McKinney performs Irving Berlin's "Swanee Shuffle." Although actually filmed in a New York studio using black actors, the sequence gives an accurate representation of a low-life black dance-hall - part of the roots of classic jazz. Most Hollywood films of the period sanitized black music.

Given the equipment available at the time, the film's soundtrack was a technical achievement, employing a much wider range of editing and mixing techniques than was generally used in "talkies" in this period.

Reception
Exhibitors were worried that white audiences would stay away due to the black cast. They hosted two premieres, one in Manhattan and one in Harlem. The black people who came to watch the film in Manhattan were forced to sit in the balcony. Hallelujah was commercially and critically successful. Photoplay praised the film for its depiction of African Americans and commented on the cast: "Every member of Vidor's cast is excellent. Although none of them ever worked before a camera or a microphone before, they give unstudied and remarkably spontaneous performances. That speaks a lot for Vidor's direction." Mordaunt Hall, in The New York Times, wrote approvingly of the all-Black cast, stating, "Hallelujah!, with its clever negro cast, is one of the few talking pictures that is really a separate and distinct form of entertainment from a stage play". The combination of two groundbreaking aspects of the film, audible dialogue and an all-black cast, set the movie apart from its contemporaries. Some of the critiques of the film spoke to the particular spirit of the times, and would likely be vastly different today. In The New York Times, Mordaunt Hall wrote: "in portraying the peculiarly typical religious hysteria of the darkies and their gullibility, Mr. Vidor atones for any sloth in preceding scenes."

Hallelujah and black stereotypes

Hallelujah was one of the early projects that gave African Americans significant roles in a movie, and though some contemporary film historians and archivists have said that it had "a freshness and truth that was not attained again for thirty years", a number of contemporary film historians and archivists agree that Hallelujah exhibits Vidor’s paternalistic view of rural blacks that included racial stereotyping.

The emphasis these critics place on Vidor’s white prejudice—all the more apparent today “given the enormous changes in ideology [and] sensibilities” since 1929—covers a spectrum of opinions. Vidor biographer John Baxter reports “a now-disconcerting [white] paternalism” that pervades Hallelujah, while film scholars Kristin Thompson and David Bordwell argue that “the film was as progressive as one could expect in the day.” Film critics Kerryn Sherrod and Jeff Stafford agree that “seen today, Hallelujah invites criticism for its stereotypes; blacks are depicted as either naive idealists or individuals ruled by their emotions.”  Media critic Beretta Smith-Shomade considers Vidor’s Hallelujah a template for racist and degrading portrayals of "Negras" in the movie industry in subsequent years.

Warner Bros., who own the rights to Hallelujah, have added a disclaimer at the opening of the archive edition:

 
In Hallelujah, Vidor develops his characterizations of black rural workers with sensitivity and compassion. The “social consciousness” of the film and its sympathetic rendering of a tale of sexual passion, family affection, redemption and revenge performed by black actors earned enmity from the Deep South’s white movie exhibitors and the “gripping melodrama” was banned entirely south of the Mason–Dixon line. Vidor’s film crew was racially mixed, and included Harold Garrison (1901–1974) as an assistant director. Black female choral conductor Eva Jessye served as musical director on Hallelujah; she would later act as music director with George Gershwin on Porgy and Bess (1935).

The overall assessment of the film from film historians ranges from condemnation to qualified praise.

Museum of Modern Arts film archivist Charles Silver made this appraisal:

Media critic Beretta Smith-Shomade asserts that from Vidor’s Hallelujah, there issued forth racist characterizations of black rural figures, in particular “the black harlot”, establishing these stereotypes in both black and white motion pictures for decades. 

Film critic Kristin Thompson  registers an objection to Warner Bros.’ disclaimer attached to its Hallelujah archive edition:

Nina Mae McKinney as Hallelujahs "harlot" 

Critic Donald Bogle identifies McKinney as the silver screens' “first black whore”, with respect to the role Vidor had fashioned for her in Hallelujah.

Nina Mae McKinney, coming from the recent stage production of Blackbirds of 1928 portrayed Chick, the object of Zeke’s desire and victim in the films’ tragic denouement. Theater critic Richard Watts Jr., a contemporary of McKinney, described her as “one of the  most beautiful women of our time”  She was dubbed “the Black Garbo” when touring Europe in the 1930s. Vidor considered her performance central to the success of Hallelujah. 

Though McKinney was the first to portray a black prostitute, this “archetypal narrative” goes back as far as 1900, when only white female actors played "the fallen woman" who turn to prostitution. of these films appeared in the silent era with narratives deploring the "plight of women who have fallen on hard times due to unemployment, unwanted pregnancies, divorce, childhood deprivation or simply because they have been ‘born on the wrong side of the track'." Throughout the silent film era, the cautionary tales of woman turning to prostitution had been uniformly presented as shameful and degrading. These Victorian-inspired scenarios, however, were declining at the time of Hallelujahs production, as they were in the industrialized countries globally. As a result "the concept of a loss of chastity leading inexorably to prostitution became no longer tenable."

The formula that Vidor used for McKinney’s Chick was modeled after conventional scenarios depicting white prostitutes in these earlier films: narratives that were already in decline. Film and social critic Russel Campbell describes the formula:  
 

 
McKinney’s exuberant and highly seductive portrayal of Chick anticipates the change in perception towards female sexual expression. Her performance influenced both black and white actresses with her version of a "rough nightlife heroine", among them Jean Harlow, a white film star who also engagingly portrayed brothel whores and prostitutes. According to film historian Jean-Marie Lecomte, "prostitutes, ladies of leisure, street walkers, and tramps, as the borderline women of Depression era America, flourished on the Hollywood screen" in the Pre-Code Hollywood following Hallelujahs release.

While acknowledging Hallelujahs racial stereotyping, critics Kerryn Sherrod and Jeff Stafford report that "the film set a high standard for all subsequent all-black musicals and still stands as an excellent showcase for the talents of Ms. McKinney and company."

Footnotes

References
Baxter, John. 1976. King Vidor. Simon & Schuster, Inc. Monarch Film Studies. LOC Card Number 75-23544.
Campbell, Russel. 1999. “Fallen Woman” Prostitute Narratives in the Cinema in Screening the Past. November 12, 1999. http://www.screeningthepast.com/2014/12/fallen-woman-prostitute-narratives-in-the-cinema/  Retrieved August 5, 2020.
Durgnat, Raymond and Simmon, Scott. 1988. King Vidor, American. University of California Press, Berkeley. 
Gotto, Lisa. 2020. Liminal Sounds - Hallelujah (1929). King Vidor, ed. Karin Herbst-Messliner and Rainer Rother, Bertz + Fischer, Berlin. 
Kramer, Fritzi. 2019. Why We Need to Keep Searching for Lost Silent Films. Smithsonian Magazine, January 9, 2019. https://www.smithsonianmag.com/history/why-we-need-keep-searching-lost-silent-films-180971196/  Retrieved August 4, 2020.
Lecomte, Jean-Marie. 2010. Outcast Lilies: Prostitutes in Pre-Code Movies (1929-1934).  LECOMTE FILM JOURNAL. University of Nancy, France. http://filmjournal.org/wp-content/uploads/2015/06/Outcast_Lilies.pdf Retrieved August 5, 2020.
Reinhardt, Bernd. 2020. Rediscovering Hallelujah (1929), director King Vidor's sensitive film with all-black cast: 70th Berlin International Film Festival. World Socialist Web Site. Retrieved May 24, 2020. https://www.wsws.org/en/articles/2020/04/07/ber2-a07.html
Clancy Sigal. 1964. Hell’s Angels. The New York Review of Books. https://www.nybooks.com/articles/1964/07/09/hells-angel/ Retrieved August 5, 2020
Sherrod, Kerryn and Stafford, Jeff. TCM. HALLELUJAH! Turner Movie Classics. http://www.tcm.com/watchtcm/movies/2120/Hallelujah/  Retrieved August 6, 2020
Silver, Charles. 2010. King Vidor's Hallelujah http://www.moma.org/explore/inside_out/2010/06/15/king-vidors-hallelujah/  Retrieved June 24, 2020
Thompson, Kristin and Bordwell, David. 2010. Observations on film art: Hallelujah. http://www.davidbordwell.net/blog/category/directors-von-sternberg/ Retrieved August 5, 2020.

External links

 

 
Classic Black Films Stand as History, Art from NPR's All Things Considered, first broadcast January 13, 2006.
 
 "King Vidor's Hallelujah" at the Museum of Modern Art
 Hallelujah essay by Daniel Eagan in America's Film Legacy: The Authoritative Guide to the Landmark Movies in the National Film Registry, A&C Black, 2010 , pages 159-160 

1929 films
American black-and-white films
1920s English-language films
Films directed by King Vidor
Metro-Goldwyn-Mayer films
Hallelujah!
1929 musical films
African-American musical films
Films with screenplays by Wanda Tuchock
1920s American films
Films with screenplays by Richard Schayer
Films shot in Arkansas
Films shot in Tennessee